Owain Daniel Doull  (born 2 May 1993) is a Welsh road and track cyclist, who currently rides for UCI WorldTeam . Doull specialises in the team pursuit on the track, and won a gold medal in the discipline at the 2016 Olympics in Rio de Janeiro; as a result, he became the first Welsh-speaking athlete to win Olympic gold.

Career history

Doull was born and raised in Cardiff, Wales where he was educated at Ysgol y Wern and Ysgol Gyfun Gymraeg Glantaf. As a child he was a keen sportsperson and played rugby as a schoolboy and started cycling for the Maindy Flyers at 14.

In 2010 he was selected for the 2011 British Cycling's Olympic Development Programme, along with fellow Welsh cyclists Amy Roberts and Elinor Barker. Roberts and Barker were also part of the Wales team that entered the 2011 Commonwealth Youth Games on the Isle of Man. Doull took two medals at the games, the silver in the Men's road race and bronze alongside Dan Pearson in the Men's team road race. In 2012 Doull completed the Olympic Development Programme and was accepted into the British Cycling Academy Programme.

Doull's first competitive tournament for Great Britain was at the 2013 UCI Track Cycling World Championships in Minsk, where he finished fifth in the Scratch race. His first podium finish was at the 2013 UEC European Track Championships in Apeldoorn, where as part of the team pursuit, he took gold along with Steven Burke, Ed Clancy and Andy Tennant.

Doull followed his European victory with success on the world stage when he was part of the team pursuit team to take gold at Manchester in the first leg of the 2013–14 UCI Track Cycling World Cup. Then in December 2013 he won two further medals in the second leg of the World Cup, this time in Aguascalientes, Mexico. He was again part of the team pursuit which took the bronze medal, and then won his first major individual medal when he took gold in the scratch race.

Doull represented Wales at the Commonwealth Games in Glasgow, 2014.

In September 2015, Doull finished third overall at the Tour of Britain, and also won the points classification.

Doull was appointed Member of the Order of the British Empire (MBE) in the 2017 New Year Honours for services to cycling. Doull kicked off his 2018 season with an appearance in the Tour Down Under.

In August 2019, he was named in the startlist for the 2019 Vuelta a España.

Major results

Track

2010
 National Junior Championships
1st  Points race
2nd Madison
3rd Individual pursuit
2011
 UEC European Junior Championships
1st  Team pursuit
2nd  Individual pursuit
3rd  Omnium
 1st  Team pursuit, National Championships
 National Junior Championships
1st  Madison (with Jonathan Dibben)
1st  Points race
2nd Individual pursuit
2nd Scratch
 1st Six Days of Ghent Future Stars (with Simon Yates)
2012
 National Championships
1st  Individual pursuit
1st  Team pursuit
2nd Points race
3rd Madison (with George Atkins)
2013
 1st  Team pursuit, UEC European Championships
 UCI World Cup
1st Team pursuit, Manchester
1st Scratch, Aguascalientes
3rd Team pursuit, Aguascalientes
2014
 1st  Team pursuit, UEC European Championships
 UCI World Cup, London
1st Madison (with Mark Christian)
1st Team pursuit
2015
 1st  Team pursuit, UEC European Championships
 2nd  Team pursuit, UCI World Championships
2016
 1st  Team pursuit, Olympic Games
 2nd  Team pursuit, UCI World Championships
2019
 2nd Six Days of London (with Mark Cavendish)

Road

2010
 1st  Points classification, Junior Tour of Wales
 2nd Road race, National Junior Championships
2011
 Commonwealth Youth Games
2nd  Road race
3rd  Team road race
4th Time trial
2013
 1st  Points classification, An Post Rás
 2nd Road race, National Under-23 Championships
 4th ZLM Tour
2014
 1st  Overall Le Triptyque des Monts et Châteaux
1st Stage 3
 2nd Time trial, National Under-23 Championships
 4th Ronde van Vlaanderen Beloften
2015
 National Under-23 Championships
1st  Road race
2nd Time trial
 Flèche du Sud
1st  Points classification
1st Stages 3 & 4
 2nd Overall Le Triptyque des Monts et Châteaux
1st  Points classification
 2nd La Côte Picarde
 3rd Overall Tour of Britain
1st  Points classification
 5th Time trial, UCI World Under-23 Championships
 7th Overall ZLM Tour
 10th Overall Tour de Normandie
 10th Ronde van Vlaanderen Beloften
2017
 3rd  Team time trial, UCI World Under-23 Championships
 7th Overall Tour du Poitou-Charentes
 9th Overall Tour of Britain
2018
 3rd Road race, National Championships
2019
 1st Stage 3 Herald Sun Tour
 2nd Kuurne–Brussels–Kuurne
 4th Time trial, National Championships
 9th Cadel Evans Great Ocean Road Race
2020
 1st Stage 4 Tour de la Provence
2021
 1st Stage 3 (TTT) Tour of Britain
2022
 7th Time trial, Commonwealth Games
2023
 10th Trofeo Palma

Grand Tour general classification results timeline

References

External links

Living people
1993 births
British male cyclists
Welsh male cyclists
Welsh track cyclists
Cyclists at the 2014 Commonwealth Games
Sportspeople from Cardiff
Commonwealth Games competitors for Wales
Cyclists at the 2016 Summer Olympics
Olympic cyclists of Great Britain
Medalists at the 2016 Summer Olympics
Olympic gold medallists for Great Britain
Olympic medalists in cycling
People educated at Ysgol Gyfun Gymraeg Glantaf
Members of the Order of the British Empire
Welsh Olympic medallists